The 2017 AIBA World Boxing Championships was held at the Alsterdorfer Sporthalle in Hamburg, Germany from 25 August to 2 September 2017.

Medal summary

Medal table

Medal events

References

External links
Official website
AIBA website

 
AIBA World Boxing Championships
2017 in boxing
2017 in German sport
Sports competitions in Hamburg
International sports competitions hosted by Germany
August 2017 sports events in Germany